Stelis argentata, commonly known as the silvery stelis, is a species of orchid of the genus Stelis.

It is found in Central America. It has stems of  flowers.

External links 

argentata
Orchids of Central America